3rd New York Film Critics Circle Awards
Announced December 30, 1937Presented January 9, 1938

Best Picture: 
 The Life of Émile Zola 
The 3rd New York Film Critics Circle Awards, announced on 30 December 1937, presented January 9, 1938, honored the best filmmaking of 1937.

Winners

Best Picture 
The Life of Emile Zola
Runner-up  –  Captains Courageous

Best Director
Gregory La Cava – Stage Door
Runner-up  – Victor Fleming – Captains Courageous

Best Actor
Paul Muni – The Life of Emile Zola
Runner-up  – Spencer Tracy - Captains Courageous

Best Actress
Greta Garbo – Camille
Runner-up  – Katharine Hepburn - Stage Door

Best Foreign Film
 Mayerling
Runner-up  –  Baltic Deputy

External links
1937 Awards

1937
New York Film Critics Circle Awards
New York Film Critics Circle Awards
New York Film Critics Circle Awards
New York Film Critics Circle Awards